The tufted antshrike (Mackenziaena severa) is a species of bird in the family Thamnophilidae. It is found in the southern Atlantic Forest.

Its natural habitats are subtropical or tropical moist lowland forest, subtropical or tropical moist montane forest, and heavily degraded former forest.

References

External links

tufted antshrike
tufted antshrike
Taxa named by Hinrich Lichtenstein
Taxonomy articles created by Polbot